For most common law jurisdictions, see: Attorney general
 For France, see: Ministère public (France)